Nabalu (en: Nabalu Town) or better known as Pekan Nabalu is a small town that is the main focus of visitors to see Mount Kinabalu in its entirety. The variety of restaurants and the fresh weather, also the view that shows Mount Kinabalu as a whole are the main reasons why many tourists come to visit Pekan Nabalu.

Agriculture, handicrafts, and selling clothes are the main sources of income for the people of Pekan Nabalu. No wonder Pekan Nabalu is a fruit shopping center, Handicrafts and a popular stopover in the area before continuing the journey. Therefore, tourism is the most important source of income for the people in Pekan Nabalu.

History
Pekan Nabalu (“pekan” means town) is used to be a “toilet stop” for tourists heading to Kinabalu Park. Now this small town is flourishing and become a “must stop” for tourists. Pekan Nabalu is only 12 KM before Kinabalu Park, so a lot of tourists stop here for toilet break or breakfast.

Village fraction 
There are several small village fractions in Pekan Nabalu among them;

 Pekan Nabalu (Center)
 Kampung Balabakan Pekan Nabalu
 Kg. Taginambur 
 Kampung Sokid Pekan Nabalu (One area with St. Philip Neri church, Pekan Nabalu)
 Kg. Giok
 Kampung Siba Pekan Nabalu (One area with SIB Pekan Nabalu church)

See also
 Nabalu corneri

References

Towns in Sabah

Landforms of Sabah
Tourist attractions in Sabah
Valleys of Malaysia